Enghave station is a former station on the S-train network in Copenhagen, Denmark. The station opened on 11 November 1911. S-train service commenced on 1 November 1934 and was latterly served by trains on Vestbanen and Frederikssundbanen.

Until 1923, the station was called Vester Fælledvej.

The station closed on 3 July 2016, when it was replaced with a new station 200 metres farther west, named Carlsberg station, which connects to the new residential area being built in the Carlsberg neighbourhood.

Cultural references
Enghave station is seen at 1:19:02 in the 1975 Olsen-banden film The Olsen Gang on the Track.

References

S-train (Copenhagen) stations
Railway stations opened in 1911
Vesterbro, Copenhagen
Railway stations closed in 2016
Disused railway stations in Denmark
Abandoned rapid transit stations
1911 establishments in Denmark
2016 disestablishments in Denmark
Railway stations in Denmark opened in the 20th century